The following is a list of awards and nominations received by Canadian actress Rachel McAdams. She has received numerous awards and nominations throughout her career. For her performance in Spotlight, she was awarded a Screen Actors Guild Award, Critics' Choice Movie Award, Satellite Award, and Independent Spirit Award, as well as a nomination for the Academy Award for Best Supporting Actress. McAdams has also been nominated for a BAFTA Rising Star Award and won numerous MTV Movie Awards and Teen Choice Awards.

Major Associations

Academy Awards

BAFTA Awards
The British Academy Film Awards are presented in an annual award show hosted by the British Academy of Film and Television Arts (BAFTA). As of 2008, it has taken place in Central London at the Royal Opera House, the latter having taken over from the flagship Odeon cinema on Leicester Square.

Critics' Choice Movie Awards

Critics' Choice Television Awards

Screen Actors Guild Awards
The Screen Actors Guild Awards are given by the Screen Actors Guild‐American Federation of Television and Radio Artists (SAG-AFTRA) and recognize outstanding performances in film and prime time television.

Film Industry Awards

Gemini Awards

Genie Awards

Gotham Independent Film Awards
The Gotham Awards recognize outstanding achievement in American independent films.

Independent Spirit Awards

Satellite Awards

Saturn Awards

Film Festival Awards

ShoWest

Santa Barbara International Film Festival

Critics Associations Awards

Boston Online Film Critics Association

Boston Society of Film Critics

Denver Film Critics Society

Detroit Film Critics Society

Florida Film Critics Circle

New York Film Critics Online

San Diego Film Critics Society

Washington D.C. Area Film Critics Association

Audience Awards

MTV Movie Awards

People's Choice Awards

Teen Choice Awards

References

McAdams, Rachel